Boljoon, officially the Municipality of Boljoon,  is a 5th class municipality in the province of Cebu, Philippines. According to the 2020 census, it has a population of 17,525 people.

Geography

Boljoon is bordered to the north by the town of Alcoy, to the west are the towns of Malabuyoc, to the east is the Cebu Strait, and to the south is the town of Oslob.

Barangays

Boljoon comprises 11 barangays, of which six (including Poblacion) are coastal, and the rest inland:

Climate

Demographics

Economy

Boljoon Church

Nuestra Señora de Patrocinio Parish Church of Boljoon shows old and intricate carvings and bas-reliefs. It is in a pseudo-baroque rococo style. It has a main nave, a transcript, and twenty-eight pillars which support the walls.

Boljoon became a visita of Carcar founded according to some authors in 1599. It became an independent vicariate on 31 October 1690, and on 5 April 1692, Fr. Nicolas de la Cuadra was appointed as prior. Because of the lack of priests, the church was turned over to the Jesuits on 27 September 1737, following the recommendation of the intermediate chapter of 1732. In the year 1747, the General of the Augustinians Order proposed the recovery of the parishes left off in the Visayas.

Boljoon's earlier building had been destroyed in a raid in 1782, and its pastor Fr. Ambrosio Otero started rebuilding the following year. The work was continued by Fr. Manuel Cordero in 1794 but when Fr. Julian arrived, the work was not yet completed. He decided to build a blockhouse  on which artillery was mounted, and he enclosed the church perimeter with a wall. He finally completed the church. The church and the adjoining convento were restored by Fr. Leandro Moran (1920–1948) the last Augustinian friar to be assigned to Boljoon.

In 1999 the National Historical Institute declared it a National Historical Landmark. The following year, the National Museum declared it as a National Cultural Treasure. The Nuestra Señora de Patrocinio Parish Church withstood the 7.2 magnitude earthquake in 2013 which affected Bohol and Cebu.

The Boljoon Church is currently in the tentative list for UNESCO World Heritage Sites under the Baroque Churches of the Philippines (Extension). A proposal has been suggested by scholars to make a separate UNESCO inclusion for the Old Centre of Boljoon which includes the Boljoon Church. The same would be made for other churches listed in UNESCO's tentative sites, where each town plaza and surrounding heritage buildings would be added. No government agency has yet to take action on the proposal.
The Venerated Marian Image enshrined was Granted a Decree of Canonical Coronation by Pope Francis. The Coronation Rites was held on April 23, 2022

Discovery of 16th-century artefacts

In 2009, Japanese and Filipino archaeologists from the Sumitomo Foundation-funded Boljoon Archaeological Project conducted by the University of San Carlos with the National Museum of the Philippines, discovered ancient Japanese pottery that has been to believed to been in existence since the early 18th century. The ancient Japanese pottery that was discovered there, has proven that there was activity of trading activity between Japan and Cebu Island Philippines going back to the 16th century.

In February 2008, archaeologists discovered 26 human remains (with china plates on top of heads) and 16th-century artefacts beneath the parvis of Boljoon Church.

References

External links

 [ Philippine Standard Geographic Code]

Municipalities of Cebu